Stockport is a town in the Metropolitan Borough of Stockport, Greater Manchester, England.  The town, including the areas of Heaton Moor, Heaton Mersey, Heaton Chapel, and Reddish, contains 139 listed buildings that are recorded in the National Heritage List for England.  Of these, four are listed at Grade I, the highest of the three grades, 16 are at Grade II*, the middle grade, and the others are at Grade II, the lowest grade.

The town dates back to the medieval era, but relatively few of the listed buildings date from before the coming of the Industrial Revolution towards the end of the 18th century.  The town grew rapidly during the 19th century, and the majority of the listed buildings date from this time.  The oldest listed buildings are part of the town wall, churches, houses, and farmhouses.  From the late 18th century to the end of the 19th century the listed buildings include houses and associated structures, shops, more churches, public houses and hotels, bridges, textile mills now used for other purposes, hospitals, railway viaducts, public buildings, a school, railway buildings, almshouses, and memorials and statues.  Dating from the 20th century are banks, another mill, an electrical substation, the town hall, war memorials, a cinema, and telephone kiosks.


Key

Buildings

References

Citations

Sources

Lists of listed buildings in Greater Manchester